Anna Seile (27 September 1939 – 20 June 2019) was a Latvian politician, who served as a deputy of the Saeima.

References

1939 births
2019 deaths
People from Bauska Municipality
Latvian National Independence Movement politicians
For Fatherland and Freedom/LNNK politicians
Civic Union (Latvia) politicians
New Unity politicians
Deputies of the Supreme Council of the Republic of Latvia
Deputies of the 5th Saeima
Deputies of the 6th Saeima
Deputies of the 7th Saeima
Deputies of the 8th Saeima
Deputies of the 9th Saeima
University of Latvia alumni
20th-century Latvian women politicians
21st-century Latvian women politicians
Women deputies of the Saeima